The 2003 season of 1. deild karla was the 49th season of second-tier football in Iceland.

Standings

Top scorers

References
RSSSF Page
Top goalscorers according to KSÍ.

1. deild karla (football) seasons
Iceland
Iceland
2